The Treaty of Hamburg (German - Hamburger Vergleich or Hamburger Erbvergleich) was a dynastic house law of the House of Mecklenburg. Heavily influenced by representatives of the Lower Saxon Circle, it was agreed on 8 March 1701 in neutral Hamburg. It ended the dispute over the inheritance of the Mecklenburg-Güstrow caused by the death of Gustav Adolph, Duke of Mecklenburg-Güstrow without a male successor in 1695 and established the duchies of Mecklenburg-Strelitz and Mecklenburg-Schwerin.

External links
Reproduction of the Treaty of Hamburg (pdf)
Literature on the Treaty of Hamburg on the Landesbibliographie MV

1701 treaties
History of Hamburg
Hamburg
1701 in the Holy Roman Empire